Aussie Christmas with Bucko & Champs 2 is a Christmas album by Australian comedy duo Colin Buchanan and Greg Champion as Bucko and Champs. Released in November 1998, it peaked at number 67 and was certified platinum.

Track listings 
1998 release - EastWest (3984254762)
 "C'mon It's an Aussie Christmas" - 2:30
 "Santa's Moving To The South Pole" - 2:47
 "Barry the Elf" - 2:01
 "Snowink In Copenhagen" - 1:52
 "The Christmas Bob Bloopers" - 1:56
 "There's Nothing More Like Christmas" - 3:08
 "Boombah the Snowman" - 2:10
 "Cool Rockin' Santa" - 2:12
 "Here Comes Christmas Bob" - 1:33
 "Ryebuck Santa" - 2:57
 "Australians Let Us Barbecue" - 2:01
 "O Christmas Bush" - 3:42
 "Merry Christmas Everywhere" - 2:47
 "Twinkle Twinkle Little Town" - 4:25
 "C'mon, It's An Aussie Christmas" (Karaoke Versions) - 2:30
 "Santa's Moving To The South Pole" (Karaoke Versions) -2:47
 "Snowink In Copenhagen" (Karaoke Versions) -1:52
 "There's Nothing More Like Christmas" (Karaoke Versions) -3:08
 "Boombah the Snowman" (Karaoke Versions) -2:10
 "Cool Rockin' Santa" (Karaoke Versions) -2:12
 "Here Comes Christmas Bob" (Karaoke Versions) -1:33
 "Ryebuck Santa" (Karaoke Versions) -2:57
 "O Christmas Bush" (Karaoke Versions) -3:42
 "Merry Christmas Everywhere" (Karaoke Versions) -2:47
 "Twinkle Twinkle Little Town" (Karaoke Versions) -4:25

Charts

Certifications

References

1998 albums
1998 Christmas albums
Christmas albums by Australian artists
1990s comedy albums